Zebrahead is a 1992 American romantic drama film produced by Oliver Stone, written and directed by Anthony Drazan in his directorial debuts and starring Michael Rapaport and N'Bushe Wright (In their acting debut). The film also stars Kevin Corrigan, Ray Sharkey, and Lois Bendler.

Set in Detroit, Michigan, the film is about an interracial romance between a white teenage boy and a black teenage girl and the resulting tensions among the characters.

Plot

Zachary "Zack" is an eighteen-year-old introverted Jewish DJ and rapper, who lives with his chauvinistic father Richard, who runs a record store specializing in blues and jazz music. Zack's mother died when he was very young. Zack's best childhood friend is a young black man named Dee, who along with Zack is also a rapper, and both of them record music together. Zack works part-time at an Italian restaurant. In Zack's neighborhood, there is an eccentric man named Dominic who is a pyromaniac that lives on land adjacent to an industrial power plant.

One day at school, Zack gets into a quarrel with his girlfriend Michelle, and the both of them separate from each other. During this fight, he sees a new transfer student who just moved from New York, a black teenager named Nicole "Nikki", who turns out to be Dee's cousin. Zack becomes infatuated with Nikki despite never talking to her.

One night, Zack comes over for dinner at Dee's house. Zack confides in Dee that he is attracted to Nikki, to which the fact of him being a white man, and she is a black woman, he feels scared to proceed. Dee tells Zack that he shouldn't be concerned over that, however, Dee's father warns Zack that he might receive negativity from this. Zack then decides to finally introduce himself to Nikki, although not fully disclosing his full feelings towards her.

Zack talks to his grandfather Saul, at the record store his father runs for advice on how to deal with his current situation. To which he tells him (as Zack is a musician), to woo Nikki with his DJ skills. The following day at school, Zack brings his turntable set in the gymnasium and starts to DJ urban music. Some of the students, especially Nikki, seem to enjoy the music and are dancing to it. However, this causes friction between many of the black students who believe he's culturally appropriating, including Larry, who is into Pan-Africanism, and Calvin "Nut", one of the school's delinquent bullies.

Zack and Nikki become closer to each other. While picking up Nikki for a date one night at her home, Nut (who lives next door to Nikki), and some of his friends harass and say racial epithets to Zack and sexually suggestive rude comments to Nikki. To which they both ignore them. Zack takes Nikki to his father's record store, to where they have their first kiss. Soon after that, one day after school, Zack brings Nikki to his house, and they both make love, to which Zack's father secretly watches them in amusement. Zack soon introduces Nikki to his father, to which he couldn't care less that Nikki is black. Zack invites Nikki to a house party with some of his extended friends, to which she is the only black person there. In which Nikki meets Michelle, his ex-girlfriend to where she seems to be happy that Zack and Nikki are together. Nikki seems uncomfortable at the party, and unfortunately walks into Zack and some of his friends making friendly, yet disrespectful racist sexual jokes towards Nikki. Outraged, Nikki runs out of the party and breaks up with Zack. Nikki avoids Zack, and after telling Dee what happened, he as well distances himself from Zack. Nut and his friends, (and other black classmates at her school), tell Nikki that Zack was playing some type of sick game with her, and she needs to stay away from him. Nut also briefly seduces Nikki, to which at first she accepts his advances, but she later rejects them.

After making amends and apologizing to Dee, Zack goes to Nikki's house and apologizes to her on her front porch. Nikki decides to remain friends with Zack and invites him to a roller rink later that night, in which some of the other students from school will be there. Nut, who was eavesdropping on Zack apologizing to Nikki, becomes envious and angered. At the roller skating rink, Nut sexually harasses Nikki, which she tells him to leave her alone. Zack, who arrives late, notices Nut agitating her and tells him to stop. Nut and Zack begin to fight, to which Dee also walks over and pushes Nut to the ground. Nut then fatally shoots Dee and runs out of the skating rink.

At Dee's funeral, Zack gives a eulogy to Dee in Aramaic (the Mourner's Kaddish, a Jewish ritual, is recited in Aramaic, rather than Hebrew). Nikki while walking home from the funeral, is attacked by Nut who threatens to kill her. Nut then runs away. The following day at school, many of Zack and Nikki's classmates both talk about what happened at the skating rink. The discussion later turns heated into the fact that many classmates believe if Zack and Nikki never got together, Dee would never be shot. Nikki then quickly dismisses that fact and runs out of the classroom. The rest of the class continues into a heated racial discussion with Zack staying silent watching. After Vinnie and Larry start to get into a verbal fight, Zack runs out of the classroom. He runs into the school principal Mr. Cimino, who tells Zack to stick with his own race when it comes to relationships. He ignores him and walks past him. Back in the classroom, Vinnie and Larry start to physically fight and they both tussle outside in the hallway. Zack notices Nikki crying in the hall and goes over to comfort her, then they passionately hug.

Cast
Michael Rapaport as Zack
N'Bushe Wright as Nikki
Kevin Corrigan as Dominic
Dan Ziskie as Mr. Cimino 
DeShonn Castle as Dee
Lois Bendler as Dominic's Mother
Shula Van Buren as Michelle
Jason Willinger as Bobby
Shirley Bunyas as Helen
Martin Priest as Saul
LZ Granderson as Larry
Ron Johnson as Nut
Ray Sharkey as Richard
Jon Seda as Vinnie
Marsha Florence as Mrs. Wilson

Reception
Zebrahead has an overall approval rating of 71% based on 16 reviews on Rotten Tomatoes.

Soundtrack
The soundtrack was released on October 13, 1992 by Ruffhouse Records and Sony Music Entertainment. The soundtrack was produced and supervised by MC Serch, who contributes the track "Puff The Head". The album also features Nas, Boss, Kool Moe Dee and The Goats among others.

See also
Jungle Fever

References

External links

1992 films
1992 romantic drama films
African-American films
American coming-of-age films
American romantic thriller films
American independent films
1992 independent films
American romantic drama films
American teen romance films
1992 directorial debut films
Films directed by Anthony Drazan
Films shot in Michigan
Films shot in New York City
Films about interracial romance
1990s romantic thriller films
Sundance Film Festival award winners
1990s English-language films
1990s teen romance films
1990s coming-of-age films
1990s American films